What Madness! (Spanish: ¡Che, qué loco!) is a 1953 Spanish comedy film directed by Ramón Torrado and starring Pepe Iglesias, Emma Penella and Silvia Morgan.

The film's art direction was by Sigfrido Burmann.

Plot 
A ruined Pepe Valdés (Pepe Iglesias) tries to marry the millionaire Esperancita (Emma Penella), which triggers a series of misunderstandings.

Cast

References

Bibliography 
 Paco Ignacio Taibo. Un cine para un imperio: historia de las películas franquistas. CONACULTA, 2000.

External links 
 

1953 comedy films
Spanish comedy films
1953 films
1950s Spanish-language films
Films directed by Ramón Torrado
Suevia Films films
Films scored by Juan Quintero Muñoz
Spanish black-and-white films
1950s Spanish films